Progresivo is the debut solo album by Magnate released on June 19, 2007. The solo release was when he was an active part of the duo Magnate & Valentino established in 1998 lasting until 2013.

Track listing

Chart performance

2007 debut albums